The Perth Scorchers (WBBL) are an Australian women's Twenty20 cricket team based in East Perth, Western Australia. They compete in the Women's Big Bash League, and won their first championship in WBBL07.

History

Formation
One of eight founding WBBL teams, the Perth Scorchers are aligned with the men's team of the same name. On 9 May 2015, the WACA announced Mark Atkinson as the Scorchers' inaugural coach. At the official WBBL launch on 10 July, Jess Cameron was unveiled as the team's first-ever player signing. Nicole Bolton was appointed as Perth's inaugural captain.

The Scorchers faced almost immediate turmoil, however, with Cameron taking an indefinite break from cricket in October (she would return to the league the following season, albeit with the Melbourne Stars). Then, days before the beginning of WBBL|01, Atkinson was replaced in the head coaching role by Lisa Keightley. Despite these unexpected obstacles, the team rallied in their first match on 11 December at Aquinas College to defeat the Brisbane Heat by two runs.

Rivalries

Sydney Thunder 
The Scorchers and Sydney Thunder have met in two semi-finals:
 21 January 2016, Adelaide Oval: Defending a total of 6/118, the Thunder restricted the Scorchers to 9/110 and claimed victory by eight runs. The Thunder would go on to win the inaugural WBBL championship.
 1 February 2018, Perth Stadium: In the first innings, the Scorchers posted a total of 2/148. The Thunder were reeling by the 11th over of the run chase, having lost five wickets for just 46 runs. Fran Wilson piled on 46 runs from 28 balls late in the match but Perth, led by Emma King's 3/17, easily defended the target to win by 27 runs.

A scheduling quirk, the two teams did not meet in the Thunder's home state of New South Wales until WBBL|06 when the entire tournament was played in Sydney due to the COVID-19 pandemic. From 2017 to 2018, five of their regular season encounters were played at Lilac Hill Park and characterised by close finishes, including:
 7 January 2018: The Scorchers were well poised to chase down their target of 146 until a catch on the boundary by Thunder fielder Lisa Griffith dismissed Nicole Bolton for 71 in the 18th over. On the last ball of the match, Scorchers batter Mathilda Carmichael was run out by a metre while attempting a game-tying run, therefore securing victory for the Thunder by the narrowest of margins.
 29 December 2018: The Thunder were catapulted to a score of 5/179 by a late 49-run partnership between Harmanpreet Kaur and Stafanie Taylor (which included 21 runs off the 18th over against the bowling of Taneale Peschel, who had taken 1/12 in her first three overs). Eight overs into the second innings, captain Meg Lanning had scored 71 of the Scorchers' 83 runs. Although Lanning was run out for 76 in the tenth over, Elyse Villani went on to score 66 not out, guiding the Scorchers to a six-wicket victory with one ball remaining. In doing so, the Scorchers set a new WBBL record for highest successful run chase.

Sydney Sixers 
The Sydney Sixers have met, and defeated, the Scorchers in two championship deciders:

 28 January 2017, WACA Ground: With Sydney captain Ellyse Perry sidelined due to a hamstring injury, the Sixers posted a modest total of 5/124 in the first innings. An unbeaten knock of 35 from 30 balls by Katherine Brunt was not enough to secure victory for the Scorchers, as the Sixers "fielded like demons and bowled dry" in a "veritable classic" to win by a narrow seven-run margin and claim their maiden title. Sarah Aley earned Player of the Final honours for her bowling figures of 4/23 off four overs.
 4 February 2018, Adelaide Oval: Electing to bat first, the Scorchers were steamrolled for 99 all out. The Sixers experienced little difficulty in the run chase, mowing down the required target with nine wickets in hand and 30 balls remaining to claim a second consecutive WBBL title. Sarah Coyte earned Player of the Final honours for her bowling figures of 3/17 off four overs.

Brisbane Heat 
Noteworthy matches between the Scorchers and the Brisbane Heat include:
 11 December 2015, Aquinas College: The Scorchers, in their first-ever game, successfully defended a total of just 9/106 by bowling out the Heat for 104. Katherine Brunt finished with bowling figures of 4/17 and was also credited for the run out of Holly Ferling on the last ball of the match, securing a two-run victory for the Scorchers.
 24 January 2017, WACA Ground: In the WBBL|02 semi-finals, Perth chased down the target of 125 with 26 balls remaining. In what was a thumping defeat, the only wicket Brisbane managed to take was that of Elyse Villani, for 52, via run out.
 26 December 2018, Perth Stadium: Played as a double-header after a men's match in front of a reported crowd of 14,983 spectators (setting a new attendance record for a WBBL game in Western Australia), the Scorchers' total of 5/136 was chased down by the Heat with five wickets in hand and four balls remaining.

Adelaide Strikers 
In the league's early years, the Scorchers and Adelaide Strikers experienced several instances of senior members switching allegiances:
Inaugural Strikers captain Lauren Ebsary joined the Scorchers after just one season.
Former Scorchers captain Suzie Bates moved to the Strikers ahead of WBBL|03 and became the first player to lead two WBBL clubs.
After scoring the most runs for Perth throughout WBBL|01, Charlotte Edwards transferred to Adelaide in her final year of cricket. The following season, Edwards assumed an assistant coaching role for the Strikers.
Ahead of WBBL|06, former Adelaide all-rounder Shelley Nitschke was appointed to the position of head coach for the Scorchers.

Noteworthy matches between the two teams include:
 13 January 2018, Traeger Park: In a match reduced to 16 overs per side due to a rain delay, the Scorchers could only muster a first innings score of 9/87. In the run chase, Suzie Bates played a lone hand of 49 not out to help the Strikers win by six wickets with one ball to spare.
 9 November 2019, Karen Rolton Oval: An innings of 80 runs from 58 deliveries by Amy Jones helped Perth post a total of 3/173. Despite a slow start to the run chase, Adelaide finished strongly with Bridget Patterson scoring 60 off 32 balls. However, Heather Graham conceded just a single off the final ball to give the Scorchers a two-run win.
 7 December 2019, Allan Border Field: In the WBBL|05 semi-finals, the Strikers comfortably reached the required total of 127 with eight wickets in hand and eleven balls remaining to eliminate the Scorchers from the tournament.

Captaincy records

There have been six captains in the Scorchers' history, including matches featuring an acting captain.

Source:

Season summaries

Home grounds

Players

Current squad

Australian representatives
 The following is a list of cricketers who have played for the Scorchers after making their debut in the national women's team (the period they spent as both a Scorchers squad member and an Australian-capped player is in brackets):

Overseas marquees
The following is a list of cricketers who have played for the Scorchers as overseas marquees:

Associate rookies

Statistics and awards

Team stats
Champions: 1 – WBBL07 
Runners-up: 2 – WBBL02, WBBL03
Minor premiers: 1 – WBBL|07
 Win–loss record:

 Highest score in an innings: 2/194 (20 overs) vs Melbourne Renegades, 3 November 2021
 Highest successful chase: 4/180 (19.5 overs) vs Sydney Thunder, 29 December 2018
 Lowest successful defence: 9/106 (20 overs) vs Brisbane Heat, 11 December 2015
 Largest victory:
 Batting first: 104 runs vs Melbourne Renegades, 12 November 2022
 Batting second: 55 balls remaining vs Melbourne Stars, 10 November 2021
 Longest winning streak: 7 matches (17 November 2021 – 20 October 2022)
 Longest losing streak: 4 matches

Source:

Individual stats
 Most runs: Elyse Villani – 1,706
 Highest score in an innings: Sophie Devine – 103 (68) vs Sydney Sixers, 8 November 2020
 Highest partnership: Sophie Devine and Beth Mooney – 173 vs Sydney Thunder, 24 October 2021
 Most wickets: Heather Graham – 102
 Best bowling figures in an innings: Marizanne Kapp – 4/10 (4 overs) vs Hobart Hurricanes, 7 November 2021
 Hat-tricks taken: Nicole Bolton vs Hobart Hurricanes, 19 December 2015
 Most catches (fielder): Heather Graham – 35
 Most dismissals (wicket-keeper): Beth Mooney – 20 (15 catches, 5 stumpings)

Source:

Individual awards
 Player of the Match:
 Elyse Villani – 10
Sophie Devine – 8
Beth Mooney – 7
Heather Graham – 6
 Nicole Bolton, Meg Lanning – 5 each
 Katherine Brunt, Charlotte Edwards, Amy Jones – 4 each
 Nat Sciver – 3
 Marizanne Kapp, Alana King, Emma King – 2 each
 Amy Edgar, Maddy Green, Katie-Jane Hartshorn – 1 each
 WBBL Player of the Tournament: Sophie Devine – WBBL06
WBBL Player of the Final: Marizanne Kapp – WBBL07
 WBBL Team of the Tournament:
 Beth Mooney (3) – WBBL06, WBBL07, WBBL08
Katherine Brunt (2) – WBBL02, WBBL03
 Sophie Devine (2) –  WBBL|06, WBBL|07
Meg Lanning (2) – WBBL04, WBBL05
Nicole Bolton – WBBL|03
 Charlotte Edwards – WBBL01
 Heather Graham – WBBL|04
 Taneale Peschel – WBBL|06
 Elyse Villani – WBBL|03

Sponsors

See also

Cricket in Western Australia
Western Australian Cricket Association
Western Fury

References

Notes

External links
 

 
Women's Big Bash League teams
Cricket teams in Western Australia
Cricket clubs established in 2015
2015 establishments in Australia
Sporting clubs in Perth, Western Australia